Narcissus mosaic virus (NMV) is a plant pathogenic virus in the genus Potexvirus and family Alphaflexiviridae, which infects Narcissus.

Description
Isolated in the Netherlands and the UK from Narcissus pseudonarcissus in 1946, it is generally symptomless.

Gallery

References

External links

 Descriptions of Plant Viruses: Narcissus mosaic virus
 ICTVdB - The Universal Virus Database: Narcissus mosaic virus

Viral plant pathogens and diseases
Potexviruses